Skorpa is an island in the municipality in Kinn in Vestland county, Norway.

The island is rocky, mountainous, and barren.  Almost all the settlement is located on the southwestern shore.  The population (2001) was about 60 residents.

See also
List of islands of Norway

References

Islands of Vestland
Kinn